Precious Hearts Romances Presents: Araw Gabi (International title: The Secrets of El Paraiso / ) is a 2018 Philippine drama television series under Precious Hearts Romances based on the Filipino pocket book novel El Paraiso by Martha Cecilia, starring JM de Guzman and Barbie Imperial. The series premiered on ABS-CBN's Kapamilya Gold afternoon block and worldwide via The Filipino Channel from April 30 to October 12, 2018, replacing Hanggang Saan and was replaced by Precious Hearts Romances Presents: Los Bastardos.

It is the 18th installment of the Precious Hearts Romances Presents series, six years after Paraiso in 2012. The network decided to reboot the franchise under RSB Unit.

The drama is JM de Guzman's fifth appearance and his first lead role in the Precious Hearts Romances Presents after having played supporting roles in The Substitute Bride, Midnight Phantom, Kristine, and Alyna. The drama is also Barbie Imperial's first lead role; she previously appeared with de Guzman on All of Me in 2015.

Synopsis
Mitchelle, an aspiring lass with a sunny disposition in life, meets Adrian, the ill-tempered CEO of Olvidar Group of Companies. Despite Adrian having an evil reputation, Mich still believes that Adrian is not like what the others think. Subsequently, Mich travels to El Paraiso and learns further not just about Adrian's secrets but also about her true identity and the certain lighthouse.

Cast and characters

Protagonist
JM De Guzman as Adrian Olvidar
Barbie Imperial as Michelle "Mich/Boning" Verano-Olvidar / Anna Vida De Alegre-Olvidar

Antagonist
Vina Morales as Celestina De Alegre

Lead and Main cast 
Rita Avila as Odessa Olvidar / Celestina De Alegre
Ara Mina as Amanda Rodriguez / Harriet De Alegre
Raymond Bagatsing as Virgilio De Alegre
RK Bagatsing as Dr. David Garcia
Jane Oineza as Amber Distrito
Phoebe Walker as Tanya De Alegre
Victor Silayan as Francisco "Franco" Mamaril
Ysabel Ortega as Veronica "Nica" Marcelo
Paulo Angeles as Frederico "Red" De Alegre, Jr./ Frederico "Red" Mamaril

Supporting cast 
Arlene Muhlach as Fe Marcelo
Eric Nicolas as Kiko Marcelo
Joshua Colet as Isaac Rodriguez
Jai Agpangan as Ice
Alexa Miro as Jessica
Ivana Alawi as Rina
Jose Sarasola as Emil
Vernon Hanwell as Lui
Debbie Garcia as Armie
Karen Toyoshima as Madge
Mailes Kanapi as Conchita
Nikka Valencia as April

Guest cast
Ping Medina as Gardo Leoncio
Josef Elizalde as Sid Romero
Allan Paule as Lucas Rodriguez
Margo Midwinter as Mia Tolentino
Mark Rivera as SPO2 Demaisip
Ian Batherson as Leo
Ben Isaac as Paul
Kirst Viray as Kurt
Riva Quenery as Ariana
Jay Gonzaga as Kidlat
Vanessa Alariao as Becky

Special participation
Angelica Rama as young Mich / Anna Vida
Adrian Cabido as young Adrian
Myrtle Sarrosa as teenage Celestina
Ethan Salvador as teenage Virgilio
Kristine Hammond as teenage Harriet
Carlo Lacana as teenage Lucas
Candy Pangilinan as Emmy Reyes-Verano / Lupe Reyes
Dennis Padilla as Alonzo Verano / Vicente Reyes
Ana Roces as Harriet De Alegre
Johnny Revilla as Frederico "Fred" De Alegre, Sr.
Simon Ibarra as Armando Olvidar

Reception

Awards and nominations

See also
List of programs broadcast by ABS-CBN
List of ABS-CBN drama series

References

External links
 
 

Philippine romance television series
Television shows based on books
ABS-CBN drama series
2018 Philippine television series debuts
2018 Philippine television series endings
Filipino-language television shows
Television shows set in the Philippines